This is a list of tennis players who have represented the Austria Fed Cup team in an official Fed Cup match. Austria have taken part in the competition since 1963.

Players

References

External links
Österreichischer Tennisverband

Fed Cup
Lists of Billie Jean King Cup tennis players